Aksakovo is a rural locality (a village) in Denisovskoye Rural Settlement, Gorokhovetsky District, Vladimir Oblast, Russia. The population was 5 as of 2010.

Geography 
Aksakovo is located on the Kurzha River, 25 km southwest of Gorokhovets (the district's administrative centre) by road. Yeskino is the nearest rural locality.

References 

Rural localities in Gorokhovetsky District